The McLaren M1A, and its derivatives, the McLaren M1B and the McLaren M1C, are a series of mid-engined Group 7 sports prototype race cars built by McLaren, between 1963 and 1968. The M1A was the team's first self-designed and developed sports car. Later versions, such as the 'M1B' and 'M1C', competed and raced in the North American Can-Am series, starting in  1966 season. The car was raced in North America and Europe in 1963 and 1964 in various Group 7 and United States Road Racing Championship series events. 24 examples of the M1A and M1B were built, and 25 examples of the M1C were manufactured. They were powered by a few different motors, including Chevrolet small-block engine, an Oldsmobile V8 engine, a Chevrolet big-block engine, and even a Ford FE engine. It was constructed out of a tubular space frame chassis, and, combined with its light weight of  this gave it a great power-to-weight ratio. This drove the rear wheels through a Hewland L.G.500 four-speed manual transmission.

References

External links

M1A
Can-Am cars
Sports racing cars
Sports prototypes